Émilie de Turckheim (5 October 1980, Lyon) is a French writer. She is a cousin of actress Charlotte de Turckheim.

Biography 
After a license in French law and Anglo-American law, Émilie de Turckheim entered Sciences Po, then studied sociology.

Since 2004, she is a prison visitor at the Fresnes Prison.

At 24, she published her first novel, Les Amants terrestres, at éditions . She was awarded the Prix littéraire de la vocation in 2009 for Chute libre and the Prix Bel-Ami in 2012 for Héloïse est chauve. Le Joli mois de Mai was translated into German at Klaus Wagenbach.

Emilie de Turckheim is a model for painters and sculptors, an experience she recounts in La Femme à modeler. published in 2012

In April 2013, she published Jules et César and Mamie Antoinette at the publishing house "Naïve" of which she is director of collection.

She received the Prix Roger Nimier in 2015 for La Disparition du nombril.

Publications

Novels 
2005: Les Amants terrestres, Le Cherche Midi, 
2007: Chute libre, Le Rocher,  (Prix littéraire de la vocation 2009)
2008: Les Pendus, Ramsay, 
2010: Le Joli mois de mai, 
2012: Héloïse est chauve, Héloïse d'Ormesson,  (Prix Bel-Ami 2012)
2013: Une sainte, Héloïse d'Ormesson, 
2014: La Disparition du nombril, Héloïse d'Ormesson,  (Prix Roger Nimier 2015)
2015: Popcorn Melody, Héloïse d'Ormesson,

Narrative 
2012: La Femme à modeler, Naïve,
2018: Le Prince à la petite tasse, Calmann-Lévy,

Albums for children 
2013: Jules et César, Naïve,
2013: Mamie Antoinette, Naïve,

References

External links 
 Héloïse est chauve, par Emilie de Turckheim, L'express, 27 février 2012.
 Heloïse est chauve d’Emilie de Turckheim, un roman complétement libre, Toutelaculture.com, 9 février 2012.
 De l'importance d'être constante, Le Point, 23 février, 2012.
 Emilie de Turckheim: une plume qui strangule le prêt à lire, BSCnews, 28 septembre 2010.
 Durchgelesen – “Im schönen Monat Mai” v. Émilie de Turckheim, Durchleser, 7 mai 2012.

Writers from Lyon
21st-century French novelists
Roger Nimier Prize winners
1980 births
Living people
21st-century French women writers